Négresse is a mountain of Savoie, France. It lies in the Bauges range. It has an elevation of 1,720 metres above sea level.

Mountains of the Alps
Mountains of Savoie